Maggid may refer to:

 Maggid shiur (or Magid Shiur) - a lecturer, generally lecturing in one place, on a given topic, on a fixed schedule
 Maggid (or Magid) - a title or profession: a wandering lecturer, often collecting funds
 Maggid of Mezritch - Rabbi Dov Ber of Mezritch, disciple and successor of Rabbi Yisrael Baal Shem Tov, the founder of Hasidic Judaism

Surname
Hillel Noah Maggid (1829-1903) Russian-Jewish genealogist and historian
Sofia Magid (sometimes spelled Maggid, c. 1892-1954) Soviet Jewish Ethnographer and Folklorist

See also
Magid (disambiguation)